Satyavaram is a village in Rowthulapudi Mandal, Kakinada district in the state of Andhra Pradesh in India.

Geography 

Demographics 
 India census, Satyavaram had a population of 103, out of which 54 were male and 49 were female. Population of children below 6 years of age were 12. The literacy rate of the village is 27.47%.

References 

Villages in Rowthulapudi mandal